Platte is an unincorporated community in Platte Township, Morrison County, Minnesota, United States, near Pierz.  The community is located along 275th Avenue near its junction with Morrison County Road 48, 233rd Street.  State Highway 25 (MN 25) is also in the immediate area.  Wolf Creek and the Platte River meet at Platte.

References

Unincorporated communities in Morrison County, Minnesota
Unincorporated communities in Minnesota